S.S. Ypiranga was a German-registered passenger/cargo steamer owned and operated by Hamburg-America Line (Hapag-Lloyd) shipping company. It was built in 1908 by Germaniawerft and measured , and measured 8,142 gross register tons.  After launch Ypiranga was found to be notoriously unsteady at sea. This was remedied by installing two water tanks near the fore and after masts on the upper deck, connected by a flying bridge. The flow of water between the tanks, controlled by regulating the movement of the air in the side branches, served to steady the ship in rough water, and it gained the reputation of being particularly steady after installation. Ypiranga's sister ship Corcovada was similarly outfitted.

In September 1910, Ypiranga carried the German crews from the battleships  and  back from the Ottoman Empire, after the ships had been sold to the Ottoman Navy. The ousted Mexican dictator Porfirio Díaz, accompanied by his family, boarded Ypiranga at the docks of Veracruz, on Wednesday, May 31, 1911, bound for Europe. He went into exile in France.

Ypiranga’s 26th voyage in April 1914 was the most notable; from Hamburg to the Mexican port of Veracruz, where it was detained by the United States for delivering arms and ammunition to the government of Victoriano Huerta in an event coined the "Ypiranga Incident".

Ypiranga served until 1919, when it was ceded to the United Kingdom as a war reparation and placed under management of the White Star Line.  In 1921 Anchor Line assumed control of the ship and renamed it Assyria, used in their Bombay run.  A Portuguese company, Companhia Colonial de Navegação, purchased the ship in 1929 and renamed it Colonial for use in their Lisbon-Angola/Portuguese East Africa run.  In 1950 there were plans to scrap the ship, but during the trip to the scrapyard under tow it broke free of her tug and wrecked near Campbeltown.

Citations

References
 

1908 ships
Ships built in Kiel
Ships of the Hamburg America Line
Steamships of Germany
Passenger ships of Germany
Merchant ships of Germany
World War I passenger ships of Germany
Steamships of Portugal
Passenger ships of Portugal
Merchant ships of Portugal
World War II merchant ships of Portugal
Steamships of the United Kingdom
Passenger ships of the United Kingdom
Merchant ships of the United Kingdom
Shipwrecks of Scotland
Maritime incidents in 1950